This is a list of Christian apologetic works.

Antiquity 

Apologia prima (English: First Apology) (c. 150-155) by Justin Martyr
Apologia secunda (English: Second Apology) (c. 150-57) by Justin Martyr
Πρὸς Διόγνητον Ἐπιστολή (English: Epistle to Diognetus) (c. late 2nd century), author unknown
The Apology to Autolycus (c. 169–83) by Theophilus of Antioch
Octavius (before 250, likely contemporary with Tertullian's Apology) by Marcus Minucius Felix 
Apologeticus (or Apologeticum) (c. 197) by Tertullian
De Carne Christi (English: On the Body of Christ) (c. 206) by Tertullian
Contra Celsum (English: Against Celsus) (c. 248) by Origen of Alexandria
De viris illustribus (English: On Illustrious Men) (c.392-3) by Jerome
Apologia contra Rufinum (English: Apology Against Rufinus) (402) by Jerome

Medieval 
Scholion by Theodore Bar Konai (8th century, Church of the East)
The Book of Proof and the Book of Questions and Answers by Ammar al-Basri (9th century, Church of the East)
On the Proof of the Christian Religion and other works by Abu Raita al-Takriti (9th century, Syriac Orthodox)
The Healer, by Gerasimos, Abbot of the Monastery of Saint Symeon (?13th century)
Summa contra Gentiles (1265–74) by Saint Thomas Aquinas

Early modern
De Arte Cabbalistica (English: On the Art of Kabbalah) (1517) by Johann Reuchlin
Pensées (1669) by Blaise Pascal
Alciphron (or The Minute Philosopher) (1732) by George Berkeley
Observations on the Conversion and Apostleship of St. Paul. in a Letter to Gilbert West, Esq (1747) by George Lyttelton, 1st Baron Lyttelton
Observations on the History and Evidences of the Resurrection of Jesus Christ (1747) by Gilbert West
The Evidences of the Christian Religion by Joseph Addison
The Evidence of the Christian Religion Briefly and Plainly Stated (1786) by James Beattie
A View of the evidences of Christianity in three parts (1794) by William Paley
Génie du christianisme (1802) (English: The Genius of Christianity) by François-René de Chateaubriand
Natural Theology or Evidences of the Existence and Attributes of the Deity (1802) by William Paley
Introduction to the Critical Study and Knowledge of the Holy Scriptures by Thomas H. Horne
Testimony of the Evangelists, Examined by the Rules of Evidence Administered in Courts of Justice (1846) by Simon Greenleaf
Apologia Pro Vita Sua (1864) by John Henry Newman
Christian Evidences (1837) by Richard Whately
The Evidences of the Christian Religion (1832) by Archibald Alexander

20th century 

Heretics (1905) by G. K. Chesterton
Why is Christianity True? Christian Evidences (1905) by Edgar Young Mullins
Orthodoxy (1908) by G. K. Chesterton
The Facts of Faith (1910) by Charles Edward Smith
Who Moved the Stone? (1930) by Albert Henry Ross
The Everlasting Man (1925) by G. K. Chesterton
The Problem of Pain (1940) by C. S. Lewis
The Case for Christianity (1942) by C. S. Lewis
Miracles (book) (1947) by C. S. Lewis
Mere Christianity (1952) by C. S. Lewis
 Protestant Christian Evidences (1953) by Bernard Ramm
La Phénomène Humain (English: The Phenomenon of Man) (1959) by Pierre Teilhard de Chardin
Defense of the Faith (1955) by Cornelius Van Til
Faith That Makes Sense (1960) by J. Edwin Orr
100 Questions About God (1966) by J. Edwin Orr
Jesus: The Man That Lives (1975) by Malcolm Muggeridge
The Existence of God (1979, new edition 2004) by Richard Swinburne
Campus Gods on Trial (1964) by Chad Walsh
Why I Believe (1980) by D J Kennedy
Eternity in Their Hearts: Startling Evidence of Belief in the One True God in Hundreds of Cultures Throughout the World (1984) by Don Richardson
The Way the World Is: Christian Perspective of a Scientist (1983) by John Polkinghorne
What If Jesus Had Never Been Born (1994) by D J Kennedy
Reasonable Faith (1994) by William Lane Craig
Is There a God? (1996) by Richard Swinburne
The Signature of God (1997) by Grant Jeffery
Beside Still Waters (1998) by Gregg Easterbrook
The Case for Christ (1998) by Lee Strobel
What If the Bible Had Never Been Written? (1998) by D J Kennedy
Science and Theology (1998) by John Polkinghorne
The New Evidence That Demands A Verdict (1999) by Josh McDowell
 What Did Jesus Mean? (1999) by Ron Rhodes

21st century 

A Scientific Theology (2001) by Alister McGrath
Faith, Science and Understanding (2001) by John Polkinghorne 
The Resurrection of God Incarnate (2003) by Richard Swinburne
 The Resurrection of the Son of God (Christian Origins and the Question of God, Vol. 3) (2003) by N. T. Wright
The Twilight of Atheism: The Rise and Fall of Disbelief in the Modern World (2004) by Alister McGrath
Dawkins' God: Genes, Memes, and the Meaning of Life (2005) by Alister McGrath
Skeptics Answered (2005) by D J Kennedy
Why the Ten Commandments Matter (2005) by D J Kennedy
The Language of God: A Scientist Presents Evidence for Belief (2006) by Francis Collins 
Exploring Reality (2006) by John Polkinghorne
God's Undertaker: Has Science Buried God? (2007) by John Lennox
Was Jesus God? (2008) by Richard Swinburne
The Reason for God: Belief in Age of Skepticism (2008) by Timothy Keller
What's So Great About Christianity (2008) by Dinesh D'Souza 
Atheist Delusions: The Christian Revolution and Its Fashionable Enemies (2009) by David Bentley Hart
Questions of Truth (2009) by John Polkinghorne 
More Than A Carpenter (2009) by Josh McDowell
Life After Death: The Evidence (2009) by Dinesh D'Souza
God's Philosophers: How the Medieval World Laid the Foundations of Modern Science (2009) by James Hannam 
The Dawkins Delusion? Atheist Fundamentalism and the Denial of the Divine (2010) by Alister McGrath
The Resurrection of Jesus: A New Historiographical Approach (2010) by Michael R. Licona .
The Rage Against God (subtitle in US editions: How Atheism Led Me to Faith) (2010) by Peter Hitchens
Christian Apologetics: A Comprehensive Case For Biblical Faith (2011) by Douglas Groothuis
Who Is Jesus?: Linking the Historical Jesus with the Christ of Faith (2012) by Darrell L. Bock
Exposing Myths About Christianity: A Guide to Answering 145 Viral Lies and Legends (2012) by Jeffrey Russell 
OrganicJesus: Finding Your Way to an Unprocessed, Gmo-free Christianity (2016) by Scott Douglas 
Urban Apologetics (2021) by Eric Mason

Biblical apologetics

Lines of Defence of the Biblical Revelation (1901) by David Samuel Margoliouth
A Scientific Investigation of the Old Testament (1926) by Robert Dick Wilson
Encyclopedia of Bible Difficulties (1982) by Gleason Archer Jr.
The Historical Reliability of the Gospels (1987) by Craig Blomberg
The Historical Reliability of the New Testament: The Challenge to Evangelical Christian Beliefs (2016) by Craig Blomberg

See also 
 Bibliography of books critical of Christianity
 Bibliography of books critical of Islam
 Bibliography of books critical of Judaism
 Bibliography of books critical of Mormonism
 Bibliography of books critical of Scientology
 List of apologetic works
 List of Islamic apologetic works
 Christian apologetics
 Biblical apologetics

References 

Apologetics
Lists of books about religion